In enzymology, a methanethiol oxidase is an enzyme that catalyzes the chemical reaction

methanethiol + O2 + H2O  formaldehyde + hydrogen sulfide + H2O2

The 3 substrates of this enzyme are methanethiol, O2, and H2O, whereas its 3 products are formaldehyde, hydrogen sulfide, and H2O2.

This enzyme belongs to the family of oxidoreductases, specifically those acting on a sulfur group of donors with oxygen as acceptor.  The systematic name of this enzyme class is methanethiol:oxygen oxidoreductase. Other names in common use include methylmercaptan oxidase, methyl mercaptan oxidase, (MM)-oxidase, and MT-oxidase.

References 

EC 1.8.3
Enzymes of unknown structure